Isus or Isos was a town in ancient Megaris.

References

Populated places in ancient Megaris
Former populated places in Greece
Lost ancient cities and towns